The 2012 Dauphin Clinic Pharmacy Classic was held from November 16 to 19 at the Dauphin Curling Club in Dauphin, Manitoba as part of the 2012–13 World Curling Tour. The event was held in a triple knockout format, and the purse for the event was CAD$32,000, of which the winner, Randy Bryden, received CAD$10,000. Bryden defeated Scott Bitz in the final with a score of 5–3.

Teams

The teams are listed as follows:

Knockout results
The draw is listed as follows:

A event

B event

C event

Playoffs
The playoffs draw is listed as follows:

References

External links

Dauphin Clinic Pharmacy Classic
Curling in Manitoba
Sport in Dauphin, Manitoba